"BoJack Hates the Troops" is the second episode of the first season of the American animated television series BoJack Horseman. It was written by Raphael Bob-Waksberg and directed by J. C. Gonzalez. The episode was released in the United States, along with the rest of season one, via Netflix on August 22, 2014. Rachel Bloom, Judy Greer, Wendie Malick, and Minae Noji provided voices in guest appearances in the episode.

Plot 
BoJack gets into an altercation at a grocery store with a seal, who turns out to be a Navy SEAL. The incident leads to a public relations backlash against BoJack for claims that he disrespects the troops.

Reception
The episode was met with mixed reviews from critics. Paste Magazine states that the episode "funny at times".  Den of Geek states it seems like a different show, not having the melancholy tone of other episodes.

References

External links 
 "BoJack Hates the Troops" on Netflix
 

BoJack Horseman episodes
2014 American television episodes